Murrumbidgee River railway bridge may refer to one of three bridges crossing the Murrumbidgee River in New South Wales, Australia:

 Murrumbidgee River railway bridge, Gundagai, crossing the Murrumbidgee River in Gundagai
 Murrumbidgee River railway bridge, Narrandera, crossing the Murrumbidgee River in Narrandera Shire
 Murrumbidgee River railway bridge, Wagga Wagga, crossing the Murrumbidgee River in Wagga Wagga